Patrick Run is a  long tributary to East Branch Oil Creek in Crawford County, Pennsylvania.

Course
Patrick Run rises on the South Branch French Creek divide about 2 miles northeast of Spartansburg, Pennsylvania.  Patrick Run then flows southeast and southwest through the Erie Drift Plain to Clear Lake, in Spartansburg, Pennsylvania where it joins East Branch Oil Creek.

Watershed
Patrick Run drains  of area, receives about 47.0 in/year of precipitation, has a topographic wetness index of 440.74 and is about 42% forested.

References

Additional Maps

Rivers of Pennsylvania
Rivers of Crawford County, Pennsylvania
Rivers of Erie County, Pennsylvania